Harvia Plc (natively Harvia Oyj) is a Finnish heater, sauna, spa and sauna interiors manufacturer. The company's product offering covers all three sauna types: traditional sauna, steam sauna and infrared sauna. Harvia is headquartered in Muurame, Central Finland. The company's products are distributed globally through a network of dealers. Harvia shares (“HARVIA”) are listed on the Nasdaq Helsinki Ltd and are registered in the Finnish Book-Entry Register maintained by Euroclear Finland Ltd.

History
Tapani Harvia made the first Harvia woodburning stove for his own use in 1950, and Taidetakomo Harvia was founded in Jyväskylä in 1950. The first woodburning stove for sale was completed in the mid-1950s. By the end of the decade, Harvia's main product had become the sauna stove. The brand of the heaters was Har-Ve. About 500 heaters were sold annually. In 1958 the company was renamed Takomo T Harvia Ky and in 1961 it was renamed Harvia Ky. Harvia manufactured about a thousand heaters a year and employed five people. Risto Harvia (born 1948) joined the company in 1966 and Kullervo Harvia at the end of the decade.

Harvia moved from Jyväskylä to Muurame in 1972 to its own 500 square meter industrial hall. Pertti Harvia and Sari Harvia-Jyllinmaa joined the company in the mid-1970s. Risto Harvia started as CEO in 1977. By the end of the decade, the production had grown to about 6,000 heaters per year with 12 employees.

Harvia Ky changed from being a limited liability company to Harvia Oy in 1980. Tapani Harvia retired and served as chairman of the board. In addition to wood-burning stoves, Harvia began manufacturing electric stoves in the early 1980s. In the end of the decade, the company employed 32 people and manufactured approximately 20,000 wood-fired and 5,000 electric heaters per year.

Harvia shares (“HARVIA”) are listed on the Nasdaq Helsinki Ltd and are registered in the Finnish Book-Entry Register maintained by Euroclear Finland Ltd.

Harvia's registered share capital was EUR 80,000 and the company had issued 18,549,879 fully paid shares (22 March 2018). Harvia has one share series, and each share entitles the holder to one vote at the company's General Meeting of shareholders. There are no voting restrictions attached to the shares. The shares have no nominal value. The company's shares belong to a book-entry system. At the moment the company does not hold any of its own shares.

Governance
Harvia's governance and management commits to the Finnish Limited Liability Companies Act and Securities Markets Act, as well as the company's articles of association, the charters of the board of directors and audit committee of Harvia and the rules and regulations of the Helsinki Stock Exchange, rules and guidelines of the Financial Supervisory Authority as well as the Corporate Governance Code for Finnish Listed Companies set by the Securities Market Association.

References

External links

Sauna
Manufacturing companies of Finland
Companies listed on Nasdaq Helsinki
Finnish companies established in 1950
Manufacturing companies established in 1950
Jyväskylä
Muurame